Ron M.A. Heeren (born 1965, Tilburg) is a Dutch scientist in mass spectrometry imaging. He is currently a distinguished professor at Maastricht University and the scientific director of the Multimodal Molecular Imaging Institute (M4I), where he heads the division of Imaging Mass Spectrometry.

Scientific career 
Heeren obtained a PhD degree in Technical Physics at the University of Amsterdam in 1992 under the supervision of Aart Kleyn.

He led a FOM-AMOLF research group  on macromolecular ion physics and biomolecular imaging mass spectrometry (1995–2014). He was also   professor at the chemistry faculty of Utrecht University in 2001–2019.

Between 1995 and 2015, he worked on new approaches towards high spatial resolution and high-throughput molecular imaging mass spectrometry using secondary ion mass spectrometry (SIMS) and matrix-assisted laser desorption and ionization (MALDI).

Heeren has coauthored over 300 peer-reviewed articles, which have been cited over 12,600 times (Google Scholar).

Research 
Heeren’s academic research interests are  fundamental studies of the energetics of macromolecular systems, conformational studies of non-covalently bound protein complexes, translational imaging research, high-throughput bioinformatics, and the development and validation of new mass spectrometry–based proteomic imaging techniques for the life sciences.

During his postdoctoral fellowship, he worked on the development of innovative ion sources, vacuums systems, data acquisition systems and novel temperature-controlled ion cyclotron resonance cells. He used the FTICR-MS instrument for the study of collisional energy transfer and internal energy distributions. These methods were deployed to investigate their role in the determination of dissociation pathways of biomolecular systems.

As a project leader (1995–1997), Heeren led the application of high-resolution MS (FTICR-MS, FTIR imaging spectroscopy and SIMS) to the field of conservation science. He discovered and identified saponified pigment particulates in so-called protrusions in Rembrandt’s “The Anatomy Lesson of Dr. Nicolaes Tulp” in collaboration with the Mauritshuis museum in The Hague.

Heeren and his group have pioneered the development of active pixelated detectors for mass spectrometry imaging. One such detector, the Medipix detector has been adapted to enable microscope-mode imaging mass spectrometry for biomolecules to enable combined high-throughput and high-resolution molecular imaging using MALDI and SIMS.

Professional activities 

From 2008 to 2013, Heeren was the research director for emerging technologies at the Netherlands Proteomics Centre. In 2014, he was appointed to his current position as one of the scientific directors of M4I at Maastricht University. He was president of the Dutch Society of Mass Spectrometry between 2001–2005. He is one of the founding members of the Mass Spectrometry Imaging Society, and was elected its president in 2017.

Commercialization 
Heeren holds 7 patents and has established two spin-off companies, Omics2Image/ASI and the Dutch Screening Group. In 2019, he was awarded the NWO Valorisation Prize in Physics.

Awards 

 2020     Hans Fisher Senior Fellowship, Institute of Advanced Studies, Technical University of Munich Hans Fisher senior fellowship
 2020     Thomson medal, International Mass Spectrometry Foundation for distinguished contribution to international MS
 2019     NWO-Physics Valorisation prize (see above)
 2019     Brightlands Convention Award
 2014     Robert Feulgen lecturer, Society for Histochemistry
 2013     Winner, 10th Venture Challenge, Netherlands Genomics Initiative
 2012     Award, Exploratory Measurement Science Group (EMSG), University of Edinburgh, UK
 2010     Distinguished Wiley Visiting Scientist award, Environmental Molecular Sciences Laboratory, Department of Energy, US
 2008     RCM Beynon Prize, Rapid Communications in Mass Spectrometry
 2002     Bert L. Schram Award, Dutch Society for Mass Spectrometry (NVMS)

Most cited publications 
 Ščupáková, Klára; Dewez, Frédéric; Walch, Axel K.; Heeren, Ron M. A.; Balluff, Benjamin (2020-08-17). "Morphometric Cell Classification for Single‐Cell MALDI‐Mass Spectrometry Imaging". Angewandte Chemie International Edition. 59 (40): 17447–17450.
 Ellis, Shane R.; Paine, Martin R. L.; Eijkel, Gert B.; Pauling, Josch K.; Husen, Peter; Jervelund, Mark W.; Hermansson, Martin; Ejsing, Christer S.; Heeren, Ron M. A. (2018-05-21). "Automated, parallel mass spectrometry imaging and structural identification of lipids". Nature Methods. 15 (7): 515–518.
 Bruinen, Anne L.; Fisher, Gregory L.; Balez, Rachelle; van der Sar, Astrid M.; Ooi, Lezanne; Heeren, Ron M. A. (2018-06-12). "Identification and High-Resolution Imaging of α-Tocopherol from Human Cells to Whole Animals by TOF-SIMS Tandem Mass Spectrometry". Journal of The American Society for Mass Spectrometry. 29 (8): 1571–1581.
 Ščupáková, Klára; Soons, Zita; Ertaylan, Gökhan; Pierzchalski, Keely A.; Eijkel, Gert B.; Ellis, Shane R.; Greve, Jan W.; Driessen, Ann; Verheij, Joanne; De Kok, Theo M.; Olde Damink, Steven W. M. (17 April 2018). "Spatial Systems Lipidomics Reveals Nonalcoholic Fatty Liver Disease Heterogeneity". Analytical Chemistry. 90 (8): 5130–5138.
 Ellis, S. R.; Soltwisch, J.; Paine, M. R. L.; Dreisewerd, K.; Heeren, R. M. A. (2017). "Laser post-ionisation combined with a high resolving power orbitrap mass spectrometer for enhanced MALDI-MS imaging of lipids". Chemical Communications. 53 (53): 7246–7249.
 Ogrinc Potočnik, Nina; Porta, Tiffany; Becker, Michael; Heeren, Ron M. A.; Ellis, Shane R. (2015-10-28). "Use of advantageous, volatile matrices enabled by next-generation high-speed matrix-assisted laser desorption/ionization time-of-flight imaging employing a scanning laser beam". Rapid Communications in Mass Spectrometry. 29 (23): 2195–2203.
 Ellis, Shane R.; Jungmann, Julia H.; Smith, Donald F.; Soltwisch, Jens; Heeren, Ron M. A. (2013-10-18). "Enhanced detection of high-mass proteins by using an active pixel detector". Angewandte Chemie International Edition in English . 52 (43): 11261–11264.
 Jungmann, Julia H.; Smith, Donald F.; MacAleese, Luke; Klinkert, Ivo; Visser, Jan; Heeren, Ron M. A. (2012-07-27). "Biological Tissue Imaging with a Position and Time Sensitive Pixelated Detector". Journal of The American Society for Mass Spectrometry. 23 (10): 1679–1688.
 Jungmann, Julia H.; MacAleese, Luke; Visser, Jan; Vrakking, Marc J. J.; Heeren, Ron M. A. (2011-10-15). "High Dynamic Range Bio-Molecular Ion Microscopy with the Timepix Detector". Analytical Chemistry. 83 (20): 7888–7894.
 Chughtai, Kamila; Heeren, Ron M. A. (2010-05-12). "Mass Spectrometric Imaging for Biomedical Tissue Analysis". Chemical Reviews. 110 (5): 3237–3277.

References 

1965 births
People from Tilburg
21st-century Dutch chemists
Academic staff of Maastricht University
Living people
Thomson Medal recipients
Mass spectrometrists